Lieutenant Colonel Ghulam Hussain Chaudry or Ghulam Hussain Chaudry Shaheed, HJ, born in 1926, was a Pakistan Army officer who received the Hilal-i-Jurat for his service in the Indo-Pakistani War of 1971. He graduated from the Pakistan Military Academy as part of the 6th PMA, barely three years after the formation of Pakistan as an independent state. He was awarded the second most honorable and prestigious award in Pakistan, the HJ, which is awarded to officers for "acts of valor, courage or devotion to duty performed on land, at sea or in air." He was fatally wounded in the Pakistan/India war of 1971. The Pakistan/India border near Kasur, Pakistan is named in his honor.

G. H. Chaudry defended the Kasur border to his last breath; he was fatally wounded while holding up the Pakistani flag, when he was ambushed by soldiers from the Indian army. The outcome of this skirmish is unknown; however, this region still remains within Pakistani soil, and the border near where this skirmish took place is named in Chaudry's honor.

See also

Awards and decorations of the Pakistan military
Nishan-e-Haider
Hilal-i-Jurat
Pakistan Military

Punjab Regiment officers
Recipients of Hilal-i-Jur'at
1926 births
1971 deaths